Matsapha is a town in central Eswatini. Matsapha was established as an industrial park in 1965 and was officially gazetted as an urban area in 1969. Matsapha is located in the Upper Middleveld of Eswatini in the Manzini region, which is in the centre of the country. It is well located as it is on Eswatini's main east–west axis between South Africa and Mozambique,  from the junction of the Lavumisa road that leads to Durban and KwaZulu Natal.

Transport 
Matsapha is served by a railway station on the Goba railway, which connects to the city of Siphofaneni to the east.

Matsapha is also home to the Matsapha International Airport.

Bethany 
Bethany is a neighbourhood a few kilometres to the west of Matsapha. A memorial to Swazi soldiers who served in World War II was constructed near the mission there. The memorial records the names of 53 Swazi soldiers who died after returning to their home country, as well as those of 24 Swazi soldiers who died in Egypt. All Swazi soldiers not mentioned by name elsewhere are commemorated on the memorial's plaque, written in Siswati.

References

External links 
 Swaziland Civil Aviation Authority
 Matsapha Municipal Council

Populated places in Eswatini